Elizabeth Thomasian Neals (born February 8, 1974), known professionally as Eliza Neals is an American blues rock singer, songwriter, pianist, record producer, and arranger. She has released ten albums since 1997. Neals counts Barrett Strong and Joe Louis Walker as her mentors and inspiration.

Early life and education
Neals was born on February 8, 1974, in Detroit, Michigan, and raised in Southfield, Michigan. Neals began singing and performing with her two sisters, but as she reached adolescence was advised by her father that "you have to get a degree to live under this roof".  She choose to study opera and enrolled at the Wayne State University, where she graduated with a Bachelor of Arts in Music.

Career
Neals toured across Europe with the Wayne State University concert chorale, using her mezzo-soprano voice. However, her heart lay in blues and rock and roll, and eventually she had to unlearn her tuition in opera to sing in a more acceptable way for her chosen career. Back in Detroit, Neals began to perform in local clubs, where she honed her vocal styling and improved her piano playing attributes. In the mid-1990s, a chance encounter in a Detroit area health food store between Neals and customer Barrett Strong, led to Strong signing her to his own record, Blarritt Records. In 1997, her debut album, I Want More, was issued with Neals billed simply as Eliza.  A follow up album, I'm Waiting, appeared two years later. The working relationship between Neals and Strong remains to this day. Neals was the co-songwriter and co-producer on Stronghold II (2008), Strong's most recent album.

Neals self-released four albums over a ten year period, culminating in 2015's Breaking and Entering. Her original compositions gave Neals a 2015 Detroit Music Award for 'Outstanding Blues/R&B Songwriter'.  In 2017, her next offering, 10,000 Feet Below, saw all but one of the 11 tracks written, or co-written, by Neals.  The exception was her rendition of Skip James's number, "Hard Time Killing Floor Blues". Billy Davis and Paul Nelson were featured guitarists on the album, which was issued on E-H Records. Neals went on to win the 'Blues Artist of the Year' from the 'Detroit Black Music Awards' in 2018. Eliza Neals and the Narcotics (180 gram vinyl), credited to that 'band' was released in 2019. The same year witnessed the July 4 release of the EP, Sweet or Mean, also on E-H Records. Popa Chubby oversaw production of the collection, which included horn work by Ian Hendrickson-Smith and Michael Leonhart. 

Neals's next album was the reflective Black Crow Moan (2020). Neals noted it was "... more sentimental – a lot of stuff coming from way, way back. I think it’s more heartfelt. More like a confessional". It was recorded before the COVID-19 pandemic in the United States, and featured guest appearances from Joe Louis Walker and Derek St. Holmes. In 2021 Eliza Neals re-released Sugar Daddy written by Barrett Strong, featuring King Solomon Hicks on guitar, to positive reviews and airplay/rotation on Sirius XM Bluessville. While Black Crow Moan was mainly ballad led to predict the times, Badder to the Bone, was a return to her fuller blues rock sound. Neals wrote or co-wrote every song bar one, and she arranged and co-produced the collection in conjunction with Michael Puwal. The album had Neals providing both vocals and piano work, with Lance Lopez guesting on Guitar Peter Keys guesting on Hammond organ, plus Billy Davis playing guitar on one track, "Got A Gun", while Paul Randolph played bass guitar on two songs. The Steve Winwood song, "Can't Find My Way Home", had a makeover by Neals.

She performed at the 2017 and 2019 Ann Arbor Blues and Jazz Festival. Neals has been the supporting act for concerts by Barrett Strong, Joe Louis Walker, Popa Chubby, Peter Keys, George Clinton, Four Tops, Tony Joe White, Mike Zito, Tommy Castro, Walter Trout, Albert Castiglia, Micki Free, Victor Wainwright, and Solomon Hicks.

Discography

Albums:

References

External links
Official website

1974 births
Living people
American women singer-songwriters
American blues singers
Electric blues musicians
Blues rock musicians
Singer-songwriters from Michigan
Singers from Detroit
21st-century American women musicians
21st-century American women singers
21st-century American singers